Sweet Surrender is a 1935 American musical film directed by Monte Brice, written by Charles Beahan and John V.A. Weaver, and starring Frank Parker, Tamara, Helen Lynd, Russ Brown, Arthur Pierson and Otis Sheridan. It was released on December 1, 1935, by Universal Pictures.

Plot

Cast  
Frank Parker as Danny O'Day
Tamara as Delphine Marshall / Maizie Marshall
Helen Lynd as Dot Frost
Russ Brown as Jerry Burke
Arthur Pierson as Nick Harrington
Otis Sheridan as James P. Hargrave
Jules Epailly as Rozan
William Adams as Edgar F. Evans
Alois Havrilla as Alois Havrilla
Abe Lyman as Abe Lyman
Jack Dempsey as Jack Dempsey
Frank S. Moreno as Antonio Grezato
James Spottswood as Horace Allen
Leona Powers as Mrs. Horace Allen
Lee Timmons as Larry Forbes
Jack Whitney as featured dancer
Grace Peterson as featured dancer

Sample video 
 The Tune Twisters performing "Love Makes The World Go 'Round" – music by Dana Suesse, lyrics by Edward Heyman.

References

External links 
 

1935 films
1935 musical films
American black-and-white films
American musical films
Universal Pictures films
1930s English-language films
Films directed by Monte Brice
1930s American films